The St. Louis C2 Cardinal family are a series of light sport monoplanes built by the St. Louis Aircraft Corporation during the peak of the Lindbergh Boom after the Spirit of St. Louis flight of 1927.

Design and development
The Cardinal shares close proportions with the Monocoupe Model 22 also designed and built in St. Louis in 1927. The Cardinal is a two seat high wing conventional geared aircraft with side-by-side configuration seating. The fuselage is constructed with welded steel tubing. The spar is made of spruce and ribs are basswood with aircraft fabric covering. The ailerons are controlled by push-pull tubes. The aircraft were delivered with progressively more powerful engines, the  LeBlond 5DE,  and  Kinner K-5, and one with a Warner  engine.

Operational history
The prototype was presented at the 1929 Detroit Air Show.

Variants
C2-60 Cardinal
1929 -  LeBlond 5D - 10 built

C2-65 Standard Cardinal
1929 - Modified C2-60 [C1111] -  LeBlond 5DE

C2-85 Cardinal
1930 -  LeBlond 5DF - 1 built [NC559N].

C2-90 Senior Cardinal
1929 -  LeBlond 7D - 6 built, with 1 converted from a C2-60.

C2-100 Super Cardinal
1929 -  Warner Scarab - 1 conversion [X12319] for factory tests.

C2-100 Special
1 converted from a C2-110

C2-110 Super Cardinal
1929 -  Kinner K-5 - 5 built with one converted from a C2-60

Surviving aircraft
 103 – C2 airworthy at the Western Antique Aeroplane & Automobile Museum in Hood River, Oregon.
 C-106 – C2-110 airworthy at the Historic Aircraft Restoration Museum in Maryland Heights, Missouri.

Specifications (St. Louis C2-110 Super Cardinal)

See also

References

External links
Aircraft Sa-Si

1920s United States civil utility aircraft
High-wing aircraft
Single-engined tractor aircraft